Brita Alvern (fl. 1729) was an alleged Norwegian witch. She was accused of sorcery in 1729, in one of the last witch trials in Scandinavia. As the documentation of the trial is incomplete, it is unknown whether she was executed or not. Her trial is regarded as notable, as it illustrates the witch trials at the outbreak of a new age, and a conflict between a public which still believed in witches, and authorities which had become skeptical despite the law.

The case
Brita Alvern was put in trial accused of witchcraft at Indredale Skipreide in Sunnfjord on 19 February 1729. She was reported by the bailiff Hugo Friderich Mortensen upon the request of the parish vicar and the public. She denied the charges. When the bailiff applied to the higher court for permission to pursue the case further, he was met with the reply that if he wished to do so, he must do so on his own responsibility and risk his reputation, because witch trials were nonsense which were infamous for having led to the condemnation of innocent in the past. The bailiff had the support by the church, which he pointed out, but was met with the reply that the church were not to be involved in such matters.

Nevertheless, on 9 August 1729, Alvern was put on trial, now together with her brother Ole. This time, Brita Alvern confessed to have met Satan in the shape of a human with red claws, who had given her the ability to inflict sickness upon humans and animals, while Ole confessed to have been given the ability to cure gout and bleeding. The bailiff again applied to the higher authority to pursue the case further. This time, he was met with the reply that if it was necessary to continue, he should to it quickly. It is not known what happened after this, because the documents of the rest of the trial are missing. As Brita and Ole had confessed to their guilt, they are likely to have been sentenced to death. If so, they were likely the last people in Norway to have been executed for sorcery.

Context
This was not the last witch trial in Norway: in 1732, six people in Møre og Romsdal were sentenced for sorcery, though they were not executed, and in 1754, Susanne Monsdatter was tried in Hordaland. The 18th-century Norwegian witch trials, however, either did not lead to death sentences, or the documentation appears to have been missing. The last confirmed execution for sorcery in Norway was that of Johanne Nilsdatter in Kvæfjord in Troms in 1695.

References 
 Ragnhild Botheim: Trolldomsprosessane i Bergenhus len 1566-1700, Ragnhild Botheim, Hovedoppgave i historie, Universitetet i Bergen, 1999 II. 
 Paul Torvik Nilsen, Trollungar og heksejakt, 21. nov 2005 06:00
 Rune Blix Hagen, Trollheksenes djevelarbeid. Kvinneskjebner fra hekseforfølgelsens tidsalder i nord, 2006
 

18th-century Norwegian people
People from Sunnfjord
18th-century Norwegian women
People accused of witchcraft
Witch trials in Norway